Lake Neshcharda  or Lake Neshcherdo is a large freshwater lake in the Vitsebsk Voblast, northern Belarus

References

Neshcharda